Ovadia Yosef (September 24, 1920 – October 7, 2013) was an Iraqi-born Talmudic scholar, a posek, the Sephardi Chief Rabbi of Israel from 1973 to 1983, and a founder and long-time spiritual leader of Israel's ultra-Orthodox Shas party. Yosef's responsa were highly regarded within Haredi circles, particularly among Mizrahi communities, among whom he was regarded as "the most important living halakhic authority".

Biography

Early life
Yosef was born in Baghdad, Ottoman Iraq, to Yaakov Ben Ovadia and his wife, Gorgia. In 1924, when he was four years old, he immigrated to Jerusalem, Mandatory Palestine, with his family. In Palestine, the family adopted the surname "Ovadia". Later in life, Ovadia Yosef changed his surname to be his middle name, "Yosef", to avoid the confusion of being called "Ovadia Ovadia".

The family settled in the Beit Yisrael neighborhood of Jerusalem, where Yaakov operated a grocery store. The family was poor, and Yosef was forced to work at a young age. He learned in Talmud Torah B'nei Zion in the Bukharim quarter, where his passion and skill for Torah study was apparent. His literary career began at age 9 with a commentary on Reshit Chochmah, which he penned in the margins.

In 1933, Hakham Sadqa Hussein prevailed upon Yaakov to send his son to Porat Yosef Yeshiva. He soon advanced to the highest shiur taught by the rosh yeshiva, Rabbi Ezra Attiya.

Attiya was instrumental in keeping Yosef in the Torah world. At one point, the diligent young scholar suddenly stopped coming to yeshiva for several days. Attiya paid a visit to his home, and was shocked by the poverty he saw there. Yosef's father explained that he needed the boy to work for him. Attiya attempted to convince the father of the importance of Torah learning, to no avail. The next morning, when the father entered his store, he found Attiya standing there, wearing a work apron. The rosh yeshiva explained that he had come to the store early that morning when Yosef was opening up. He had told the youth that he had found a substitute worker who would work without pay, and sent him back to yeshiva. "You said that you needed someone to help and could not afford to pay. I am that someone. Your son's learning is more important than my time," he told the father, who finally conceded and allowed his son to continue learning in yeshiva. Yosef soon composed his first sefer, together with two friends, called Machberet Ha'atakat Hidot.

In 1937, Rabbi Yaakov Dweck sent Yosef to give the daily Ben Ish Hai halakha shiur in his stead at the Ohel Rachel Synagogue for the Persian Jewish community in the Beit Yisrael neighborhood. In the course of giving this shiur, Yosef dissented many times with the stringent opinions of the Ben Ish Hai, who preferred the rulings of the Ari zal over Yosef Karo. This was a defining moment for Yosef, who had found a podium to give air to his opinions, while simultaneously learning how to deal with the negative feedback he was receiving from many in his audience, especially from his fellow Iraqi Jews. A number of notable rabbis, among them Yitzhak Nissim, rebuked him over the years for his positions, even burning his first halakha sefer, Hazon Ovadia. But Rabbi Attiya encouraged his student to continue ruling according to his own understanding. Yosef's objections on Ben Ish Hai, for many years in handwritten form only, were printed beginning in 1998 with the appearance of his Halikhot Olam.

Yosef received rabbinic ordination at the age of 20. He became a long-time friend of several members of his class who went on to prominent leadership positions in the Sephardi world, such as Rabbi Ben Zion Abba Shaul, Rabbi Baruch Ben Haim, Rabbi Yehuda Moallem and Rabbi Zion Levy.

Residing in Egypt 
In 1947, Yosef was invited to Cairo by Rabbi Aharon Choueka, founder of yeshiva 'Ahavah VeAchvah', to teach in his yeshiva. Yosef also served, at the request of Rabbi Ben-Zion Meir Hai Uziel, as head of the Cairo beth din (rabbinical court). Yosef found that religious observance was lax in Egypt, be it the Jewish community at large, or even its rabbis. One of the major Halachic issues was the lack of any organised system of Kashrut, which led to conflict between him and other members of the community. It was due to these events that Yosef resigned from his position, just two years after arriving in Cairo. Approximately one year later he returned to what in the meantime had become Israel.

Return to Israel 
Back in Israel, Yosef began studying at midrash "Bnei Zion", then headed by Rabbi Tzvi Pesach Frank. He also served on the rabbinical court in Petah Tikva. His boldness as a posek was already revealed in his first term as a dayan when, at the age of 30, he wrote a Halachic ruling favoring Yibbum over Halitza, which contradicted a religious ruling made by the Chief Rabbinate of Israel a year earlier, which had forbidden Yibbum.

In 1951–1952 (תשי"ב by the Jewish calendar), he published his first halakha sefer, Hazon Ovadia on the laws of Passover. The book won much praise, and received the approval of the two Chief Rabbis of Israel at the time, Ben-Zion Meir Hai Uziel and Yitzhak HaLevi Herzog. Two years later he founded 'Or HaTorah' Yeshiva for gifted Sephardic Yeshiva students. This Yeshiva (which did not remain open for long) was the first of many which he established, later with the help of his sons, in order to facilitate Torah education for Sephardic Jews, in order to provide leadership for the community in future generations. In 1953-4 (תשי"ד) and 1955-6 (תשט"ז), he published the first two volumes of his major work Yabia Omer, which also received much praise.

Between 1958 and 1965, Yosef served as a dayan in the Jerusalem district Beth Din. He was then appointed to the Supreme Rabbinical Court of Appeals in Jerusalem, eventually becoming the Chief Sephardic Rabbi of Tel Aviv in 1968, a position which he held until his election as Chief Sephardic Rabbi of Israel in 1973.

Rishon LeZion 
In 1973, Yosef was elected Sephardic Chief Rabbi of Israel by a majority vote of 81 to 68, replacing Yitzhak Nissim. His candidacy was criticised by some, as he was competing against an incumbent Chief Rabbi for the first time in the history of that office. The election process was characterised by tension and political controversy because of the Psak Din of the Brother and Sister and due to the tense relations between Yosef and Nissim. In the same election, Rabbi Shlomo Goren was chosen as the Ashkenazi Chief Rabbi of Israel, the relationship with whom would prove to be difficult. The Council of the Chief Rabbinate was controlled by Goren, and for some time thereafter Yosef decided that there would be no point in attending its sessions.

Entry into politics 

In 1984, Yosef founded the Shas party in response to minimal representation of Sephardic Jews in the Ashkenazi-dominated Agudat Yisrael. It has since become a formidable political force, becoming part of the coalition in most of the elected governments since. He later took a less active role in politics, but remained the party's spiritual leader until his death.

Assassination plot 
In April 2005, Israeli security services arrested three people whom the Shin Bet claimed were all members of the Popular Front for the Liberation of Palestine (PFLP). They were accused of plotting to kill Yosef. One of the three, Musa Darwish, was convicted on December 15, 2005 of Yosef's attempted murder, and of throwing firebombs at vehicles on the Jerusalem-Ma'aleh Adumim road. He was sentenced to twelve years in prison and three years probation. A second man, Salah Hamouri, proclaimed his innocence of the charges, but eventually accepted a plea bargain sentence of 7 years in exchange for admitting his guilt.

Family 
When Yosef was 24, he married Margalit Fattal (1927–1994), born in Syria, daughter of Rabbi Avraham HaLevi Fattal, when she was 17. They had eleven children.
 Adina Bar-Shalom, (b. 1946) is the founder of the first academic college for Haredi women in Jerusalem, and she studied design at the Shenkar College of Engineering and Design, both with the approval of her father. She is married to Rabbi Ezra Bar-Shalom, former Chaver Beth Din of the Upper Beit Din of Israel.
 Ya'akov Yosef, (1947–2013) was an Israeli rabbi and former politician who served as a member of the Knesset for Shas between 1984 and 1988. He is the father of Yonatan Yosef.
 Malca Sasson – nursery teacher for over thirty years.
 Avraham Yosef, (b. 1949) is the Chief Rabbi of Holon, Israel, and is a Sephardi representative on the Chief Rabbinate Council (Moetzet Harabbanut Harashit)
 Yafa Cohen
 Yitzhak Yosef, (b. 1952) is the Sephardi Chief Rabbi of Israel, also known as the Rishon LeZion, the rosh yeshiva of Yeshivat Hazon Ovadia, and the author of a popular set of books on Jewish law called Yalkut Yosef.
 Rivka Chikotai, twin sister of Sara, is married to Ya'akov Chikotai, one of the Chief Rabbis of Modi'in-Maccabim-Re'ut.
 Sara Toledano, twin sister of Rivka, is an artist and married to Mordechai Toledano, and Head of the Yabiya Omer Beit Midrash as well as an Av Beit Din in Jerusalem.
 David Yosef, (b. 1960) married to Sofia, is the head of the Yechaveh Da'at Kollel, the chief neighbourhood rabbi of Har Nof, and credited with introducing his best friend Aryeh Deri to his father. He was appointed to Moetzet Chachmei HaTorah after his father died.
 Leah Butbul
 Moshe Yosef, (b. 1966), a rabbi married to Yehudit. Both lived and cared for Yosef in his apartment. Moshe is the head of the Badatz Beit Yosef kashrut agency, and the head of the Maor Yisrael talmud torah, which also publishes the works of his father.

Final years and death 
Yosef resided in the Jerusalem neighbourhood of Har Nof. He remained an active public figure in political and religious life in his capacity as the spiritual leader of the Shas political party, and through his regular weekly sermons. He was referred to as the Posek HaDor ("Posek of the present generation"), Gadol HaDor ("great/est (one of) the generation"), Maor Yisrael ("The Light of Israel"), and Maran.

On January 13, 2013, Yosef collapsed during Shacharit at his synagogue in Har Nof, Jerusalem and was having difficulty using his left hand. After he was seen by a physician in his home, he was hospitalized at Hadassah Medical Center after suffering what was believed to be a minor stroke.

On 21 September 2013, because of his worsening health, Yosef was admitted to Hadassah Ein Kerem hospital. Two days after undergoing surgery for the implantation of a pacemaker on September 22, Yosef was sedated and placed on a respirator. He died in the hospital on 7 October 2013 after a "general systemic failure". His funeral in Jerusalem was the largest in Israel's history, with an estimated attendance of 850,000. Some religious authorities have stated that this was, perhaps, the largest in-gathering of Jews since the days of the Second Temple. However, other estimates put the number in attendance at the funeral lower, at between 273,000 and 450,000. He was buried beside his wife in the Sanhedria Cemetery. During the week-long shiva mourning period, Yosef's family were expected to receive thousands of condolence callers in a mourning tent set up on their Har Nof street, which police closed to vehicular traffic. Security guards were also posted at the cemetery, where Yosef's grave quickly became a pilgrimage site for thousands of men and women.

Halakhic approach and worldview

Meta-Halakha: Restoring the past glory 
Yosef frequently made use of the slogan "Restore past glory" (להחזיר עטרה ליושנה) as a metaphor embodying both his social and halakhic agenda.

On a social level, it is widely viewed as a call to pursue a political agenda that will restore the pride of the Mizrahi Jews (Jews from the Middle East) in Israeli society, which historically suffered from discrimination, and were generally of a lower socio-economic status than their Ashkenazi counterparts.

From a halakhic perspective, the metaphor is more complex. It is widely agreed by Rabbis and secular researchers alike that the 'crown' of the metaphor refers to the halakhic supremacy which Yosef attaches to the rulings of Rabbi Yosef Karo. According to Yosef's approach, Karo is crowned as the Mara D'Atra of the Land of Israel, and thus all Jews living within his realm of authority should be bound by his rulings. Yosef says this explicitly and in very strong terms in Yalkut Yosef (note that 'Maran' refers to Rabbi Yosef Karo):

However, there remains some disagreement over who exactly Yosef considers to be bound by the rulings of Karo.

Rabbi Ratzon Arusi argues that Yosef distinguishes between his ideal and the reality. Ideally, all Jews of the Land of Israel should be bound by Karo's rulings, but practicality dictates that first all of the Sephardic and Mizrahi Jews should unite under them first. As Arusi puts it,

Tzvi Zohar argues that Yosef adopts a melting pot approach, in that he seeks to unify the traditions of all Jews in Israel, Sephardic and Ashkenazi alike. Zohar claims that Yosef's main distinction is not between Ashkenazim and Sephardim, but between the Land of Israel and the Diaspora. In his view, Yosef seeks to apply the rulings of Karo on the entire Land of Israel, but not necessarily outside of it. According to Zohar, this represents an anti-Diaspora and "anti-Colonialist" approach, since it seeks to strip the various immigrant communities of their traditions from their countries of origin and replace them with the custom of the Land of Israel, rather than importing and implanting foreign customs in Israel. He compares between Yosef and religious reformers such as Martin Luther and Muhammad ibn Abd-al-Wahhab, and claims that Yosef has adopted a religious restorative-reformist worldview. Specifically, he argues that Yosef's halakhic approach is not, as Yosef attempts to portray it, a return to a traditional form of Sephardic ruling, but rather an innovative formulation of a particular Sephardic approach to Halakha which Yosef himself fashioned.

Rabbi Binyamin Lau disagrees with both of the preceding interpretations. According to Lau, Yosef claims that all Sephardic Jews accepted the rulings of Karo as binding in the Diaspora, but over time deviated from them. Presently, upon their return to the Land of Israel where Karo is the Mara D'atra, they should return to adhering to his rulings. Thus, Lau believes that Yosef directs his rulings only at Sephardic and Mizrahi Jews, since the Ashkenazi Jews never accepted upon themselves the rulings of Karo. Lau views Yosef as operating on two fronts: the first against the Ashkenazi leadership which seeks to apply Ashkenazi rulings and customs to the Sephardim, and the second against the Sephardic and Mizrahi communities themselves, in demanding that they unite under the rulings of Karo.

In any case, it is agreed that alongside the conservative aspects of his approach to Halacha, there are also significant reforms: his preference for the rulings of Karo, and his preference for leniency over chumra. The fulfillment of his Halakhic vision has entailed significant clashes with his Ashkenazi counterparts. On his predecessors in the post of the Tel Aviv-Yafo Rabbinate, Yosef wrote:

Preference for leniency 
Yosef adopted the Talmudic dictum that, "The power of leniency is greater". Therefore, one of his fundamental principles of halakhic ruling is that lenient rulings should be preferred over chumra. Yosef saw this as one of the distinguishing characteristics of the Sephardic approach to Halakha, compared to the Ashkenazi approach. In one of his rulings, he quoted Rabbi Chaim Joseph David Azulai as saying:

Yosef considered this principle an ideal, so that if

In Yosef's opinion, the severity of Ashkenazi poskim results from their method of teaching, and a lack of familiarity with the Mishnah, Talmud and poskim. In a 1970 article Yosef wrote about Rabbi Jacob Saul Elyashar, he says:

Yosef regarded ruling with severity as especially harmful in the current generation ("the generation of freedom and liberty"), since strict ruling might lead individuals not to comply with the Halakha. Writing in Yabia Omer, he says: "And truly, the growth of chumrot leads to leniency in the body of the Torah."

Examples of lenient rulings 
Following this principle of leniency Yosef made a number of Halakhic rulings which are significantly more lenient than those made by his Ashkenazi Haredi counterparts. Among them are:

 That it is permissible for boys and girls to study together up to the age of 9.
 That a married woman who covers her hair may expose a few centimeters of hair from beneath the covering at the front.
 That it is permissible for a female widow or divorcée to wear a wig as a head covering, despite prohibiting it for married women (see below).
 That it is permissible for unmarried women to leave their hair loose and untied.

The least of evils 
Yosef aimed to encourage maximal observance of Mitzvot among as many Israelis as possible. In order to achieve this, "he is willing to follow a halakhic policy which, on the one hand, will minimize violations of the halakha, but on the other, concedes absolute adherence to the halakha". This is evident in a number of his rulings: providing kashrut certification to a restaurant that serves milk and meat; the slaughter of a chicken where there is a concern of it being trefa; and the wearing of pants by women.

Turning a blind eye 
Yosef applied a policy of turning a blind eye to deviations from the halakha in circumstances where, if strict adherence to the halakha were required, it is likely that it would not be followed at all. Examples of this include the recital of the priestly benediction by Kohanim who do not have a religious lifestyle, and a shaliach tzibur or person performing a Torah reading who shaves with a razor.

Sinai Adif 
In the Talmudic debate over Sinai and Oker Harim, Yosef was of the opinion that Sinai is preferable. Specifically, he emphasizes that the Sephardic system of learning, which emphasizes learning Halakha in depth, is superior to the common approach in many Ashkenazi schools, which relies on deep analysis of gemara employing pilpul, without reaching to the halakhic conclusions. This preference is based upon his support for ruling halakha on practical contemporary issues rather than ruling halakha as a purely theoretical pursuit. In a eulogy he wrote for Rabbi Yaakov Ades, his teacher at Porat Yosef Yeshiva, he said:

According to Yosef, the preoccupation with pilpul at the expense of learning halakha in depth causes lack of knowledge among Ashkenazi poskim, which in turn leads to unnecessary severity in making halakhic rulings, since the Posek is unaware of lenient rulings and approaches to Halakha used by previous Rabbis upon which the Posek could rely to rule leniently.

Attitude towards kabbalah 
Yosef was sometimes willing to accept rulings which rely on the rulings of the Ari zal, provided that these do not contradict rulings by Karo. In some instances, particularly in Jewish prayer, Yosef championed Kabbalistic considerations - even at the expense of Karo's rulings. Nevertheless, in many cases, he came out strongly against the rulings, saying, "We have no business with mysticism", and rejecting rulings based upon the Zohar, and the Kabbalah more generally. This position is contrary to many (but not all) traditional long-standing Sephardic rulings on Halakha, including by many Sephardic poskim to this day. In contrast with the position of Rabbi Chaim Joseph David Azulai, who wrote that, "None may reply after the Ari" (that is, none may dispute the rulings of the Ari), Yosef argues that no special weight should be attached to the rulings of the Ari, and the ordinary principles of Halakhic ruling should continue to apply. He wrote:

Yosef's attitude towards the Kabbalah, the rulings of the Ari, and consequently the rulings of the Ben Ish Hai have been the cause of strong disagreements between him and Jewish immigrants from the Muslim world in Israel, especially the Jews of Iraq. The rulings of the Ben Ish Chai were at the heart of the disagreement between him and the Chief Rabbis Yitzhak Nissim and Mordechai Eliyahu.

Attitude towards minhag and traditions 
Yosef gave strong preference to the written word, and did not attribute significant weight to minhagim and traditions which are not well anchored in the Halakha. For example, he expressed opposition to two minhagim observed in the Synagogues of North African Jewry: standing during the reading of the Ten Commandments, and the involvement of the congregation in certain parts of the prayer service. His attempts to change popular and deeply rooted traditions have led to opposition to his approach among some North African Rabbis.

Breslov Hasidim have the custom of going on a pilgrimage to the tomb of Rebbe Nachman of Breslov in Uman for Rosh Hashanah. Yosef has been highly critical of this practice, and has stated:

Attitude towards the State of Israel and its citizens

Ethiopian Jews 
Ovadia Yosef is often regarded as the pivotal force behind bringing Ethiopian Jews to Israel. In the 1970s, Yosef ruled that Ethiopian Jews were halachically Jewish and campaigned for the Ethiopian aliyah to Israel.  Pnina Tamano-Shata said of Yosef: "I started crying, probably in gratitude to all that he's done, the humane form of address, 'our brothers.' He was also a leader. He called on the authorities to save Ethiopia's Jews and bring them to Israel. It shows his great love for others."

Attitude to Zionism 

Yosef held a Halakhically ambivalent view towards Zionism as the Atchalta D'Geulah (beginning of the redemption). Many Religious Zionists, in contrast, view Israel as the first flowering of the redemption. In a Halakhic ruling regarding Israeli Independence Day, Yosef acknowledged that the Jewish people experienced a miracle with the establishment of the State of Israel; however, since the miracle did not include all of the Jewish people,

Yosef's position could be seen as a middle ground between the Religious Zionists, for whom saying Hallel is compulsory, and the Ashkenazi Haredim, who do not say Hallel at all.

In a newspaper interview in which Shas was accused of being anti-Zionist, Yosef responded:

In 2010, Yosef and Shas' Moetzet Chachamei HaTorah (Council of [Wise] Torah Sages) approved Shas' membership in the World Zionist Organization, making Shas the first officially Zionist Haredi party in Israel.

Yeshiva students and military service 
Yosef regarded the wars fought by the State of Israel as falling within the Halakhic classification of Milkhemet Mitzvah. Nevertheless, he encouraged young students to remain in the Yeshivas, rather than be drafted into the military, because, "despite the sensitivity which Rabbi Yosef feels towards the Israel Defense Forces, he is deeply rooted in the Rabbinic tradition of the Yeshivas in the Land of Israel, and holds their position which opposes the integration of Yeshiva students in the military". Rabbi Binyamin Lau makes a cautious distinction between Yosef's public rhetoric, which presents a unified front with the Ashkenazi Haredim, and between internal discussions, where Yosef was said to be more receptive to solving the problem of integrating the Haredim into the military.

Yosef's grandson points out his grandfather's positive attitude towards the IDF, in that whenever the Torah Ark is opened, Yosef blesses "mi sheberech" for IDF soldiers. Yosef's son, Rabbi Avraham Yosef, served in the IDF as a military Rabbi for 13 years.

Secular Israelis 
Yosef frequently referred to the present situation in Israeli and Jewish society as "the generation of freedom and liberty". By this, Yosef referred to a modern reality of a Jewish community which is generally not committed to the Halakha, and where Rabbinic authority has lost its centrality. In this context, Yosef drew a distinction between those who profess a secular ideology, and those who are non-observant merely in the sense of a weak or incomplete commitment to Halakha accompanied by a strong belief in God and the Torah:

This latter kind of non-observant Jews are, in Israel, mainly Mizrahi Jews who practice aspects of Judaism as a tradition (known as Masortiyim, not to be confused with Conservative Judaism, which is sometimes called Masorti Judaism). Yosef sought to bring this demographic closer to the Torah, while relying upon traditional Jewish sources for his rulings. For example, he ruled that those who desecrate the Sabbath are not to be considered as having abandoned the Torah, and therefore if they have touched wine, it remains Kosher. This sort of ruling differs from Ashkenazi Haredi rulings. Yosef actively aims to engage in Kiruv, while still strictly adhering to Halacha.

Yosef, however, had no sympathy towards Israeli Jews who profess a secular lifestyle, and saw them as effectively being non-Jewish. His opinion was to fully exclude them from the Jewish community. For Yosef, the secularist Israeli public are secular out of 'spitefulness' towards Torah, and he likened them to idolatrous apostates.

Israeli legal system 
Yosef was opposed to bringing civil actions in the Israeli courts, because they decide outcomes by applying Israeli law, rather than Halakha. His opposition is consistent with the position of the Ashkenazi Haredi Rabbis, and some Religious Zionist Rabbis (e. g., Yaakov Ariel) as well. On this matter, Yosef has written:

In matters of criminal law, however, Yosef is among the moderate Rabbinic voices who support the application of the rule dina d'malchuta dina ('the law of the land is the law'), and therefore, it is forbidden to engage in criminal conduct such as tax fraud. It is only in civil matters that he forbade going to the Israeli courts.

In February 1999, Yosef caused a controversy by strongly criticizing the Supreme Court of Israel:

Following these statements, the Movement for Quality Government in Israel petitioned the Supreme Court of Israel, demanding that Yosef be put on trial. The Supreme Court dismissed the application, saying that the comments were within Yosef's right to freedom of speech. Nevertheless, then-Supreme Court President Aharon Barak wrote in his judgement:

Political activity

Government influence 

In 1990, Yosef used his position as Shas spiritual leader to pressure Prime Minister Yitzhak Shamir into agreeing to hold negotiations with Arab states for a peaceful settlement of the Arab–Israeli conflict. Shamir, a member of the Likud Party, refused to make any commitments.

According to one biography of the rabbi, Ben Porat Yosef, the relationship between the two had never been comfortable because of Shamir's unstudious personality. As a way of gaining a character analysis of politicians, Yosef had invited both Shamir and Shimon Peres to learn Talmud with him. While Peres proved an engaging and fluid learner, Shamir was stoic toward the material, a trait that led Yosef to instead use one of Shamir's cabinet members, Housing and Construction Minister David Levy, as his key partner in dealing with the Likud. Levy had a relatively warm relationship with the rabbi due to his moderate approach to Israel's security and foreign affairs policies, his charismatic personality, and his connection with Sephardi traditions (Levy, a Moroccan, was the highest ranking Sephardi politician in the 1980s).

In 1990, Rav Yosef pulled Shas out of the coalition with the Likud and attempted to form a partnership with Peres's left-centre Labour Party. The bold move, engineered but opposed by Shas chairman Aryeh Deri, backfired when the highly respected Ashkenazi rosh yeshiva (dean) of the Ponevezh Yeshiva in Bnei Brak, Rabbi Elazar Shach (who subsequently founded the Degel HaTorah party) fiercely commanded Yosef to return Shas to the coalition with the Likud. During this time, Yosef was severely criticised by other major members of the Haredi religious community in Israel, particular the Ashkenazic Jews who generally sided with the Likud and the right in opposition to the perceived secularist tendencies of Labour and the left.

The failure of the scheme, known as the stinking trick, was responsible for Peres' downfall as leader of Labour, and his 1991 defeat in internal elections to former Defense Minister Yitzhak Rabin. From the 1980s until his death, Yosef approved the participation by Shas in most Israeli governments, except for the last two governments of Ariel Sharon from January 2003 and August 2005. In that Knesset (2003-2006), Shas was one of the few parties to have been in the opposition for the duration of that Knesset's term, along with the leftist Meretz party and the Arab factions Ra'am (United Arab List), Hadash, and Balad. This was largely because of the rise of Shinui to the powerful third party position, a position that was previously held by Shas. Shinui demanded the creation of a government without Shas.

In the 2007 Israeli Presidential election, Yosef endorsed his long-time friend Shimon Peres, who ultimately won the election due in part to the support of Shas's 12 MKs.

Cultural influence 
In a 2004 article by Maariv, Yosef was listed as one of the most influential rabbis in Israel. He was described as:

Position on the Israeli–Palestinian conflict 
Despite his controversial public comments, Yosef had long been a rabbinical authority advocating peace negotiations in the Israeli–Palestinian conflict, and had done so since the late 1980s. His main justification was the halakhic principle of Pikuach Nefesh, in which all the Jewish commandments (excluding adultery, idolatry, and murder) are put on hold if a life is put in danger. Using an argument first articulated by the late American rabbinical leader Joseph Soloveitchik, Yosef claimed that the Arab–Israeli conflict endangers human lives, thereby meeting the above criteria and overruling the priority of commandments pertaining to settling the land of Israel. Therefore, Israel is permitted—even obligated if saving lives is a definitive outcome—to make serious efforts to reach a peace settlement, as well as to make arrangements to properly protect its citizens. Yosef first applied the Pikuach Nefesh principle to Israel's conflicts with its neighbors in 1979, when he ruled that this argument granted Israel authority to return the Sinai Peninsula to Egypt. Some claimed, however, that the ruling was also motivated by Yosef's desire to oppose his Ashkenazi colleague, Rabbi Shlomo Goren.

Using this precedent, Yosef instructed Shas to join Prime Minister Yitzhak Rabin's government coalition, and later that of Ehud Barak as well. However, Shas abstained on Oslo I and voted against the Oslo II agreement. Furthermore, as Oslo stalled, and relations between Israelis and Palestinians began to deteriorate, and particularly following the outbreak of the Al-Aqsa Intifada, Yosef and the party pulled "rightward", supporting the Likud.

In 2005, Yosef repeatedly condemned the Gaza Disengagement. He argued that he was opposed to any unilateral action that occurred outside the framework of a peace agreement. Yosef again cited the principle of Pikuach Nefesh, saying that empowering the Palestinians without a commitment to end terror would result in threatening Jewish lives, particularly in areas near Gaza in range of Qassam rocket attacks. In contrast to some of his rabbinical colleagues, such as Rabbi Yosef Shalom Eliashiv, Yosef refused to entertain the idea of holding a referendum on the disengagement, and instructed his MKs to vote against the plan when it came up in the Knesset.

Yosef always maintained that Pikuach Nefesh applies to the Israeli–Palestinian conflict and supported negotiations with the Palestinians. However, toward the end of his life, he no longer appeared totally convinced that diplomacy with the PA leadership would necessarily end the violence. Some media analysts had suggested that then Prime Minister Ehud Olmert may have been able to convince the rabbi to sign on to further unilateral actions by the government if concerted efforts toward negotiation failed.

Yosef protested strongly against demands by the United States and other foreign countries that Israel freeze construction in East Jerusalem, saying that, "It's as if we are their slaves". However, toward the end of his life, he indicated some flexibility on the issue, and may have taken a more pragmatic approach. In the wake of the diplomatic row between Israel and the US over Jewish housing in east Jerusalem, Yosef is reported to have said, in a private meeting with Shimon Peres, that "it is not permissible to challenge the nations of the world or the ruling powers", and that Israel should agree to a partial building freeze in East Jerusalem, at least temporarily.

Halakhic rulings 

Yosef is generally considered one of the leading halakhic authorities, particularly for Sephardi and Mizrahi Jews, who bestowed upon him the honorific title of "Maran".

Some of his more famous legal rulings include:

 In 1973, as Chief Sephardic Rabbi of Israel, he ruled, based on the Radbaz and other opinions, that the Ethiopian Beta Israel were Jews and should be brought to Israel. He was later joined by a number of other authorities who made similar rulings, including the Chief Ashkenazi Rabbi Shlomo Goren. Other notable poskim, from non-Zionist Ashkenazi circles, placed a halakhic safek (doubt) over the Jewishness of the Beta Israel. Such dissenting voices include Rabbis Elazar Shach, Yosef Shalom Eliashiv, Shlomo Zalman Auerbach, the Lubavitcher Rebbe, and Moshe Feinstein.
 That it is legitimate and permissible to give territory from the Land of Israel in order to achieve a genuine peace. When the Oslo Accords were followed by an intifada, this opinion was later retracted.
 Supported the sale of the land during the Sabbatical year, following the Sephardic tradition.
 Ordered the Shas political party to vote in favour of a law recognizing brain death as death for legal purposes. The Ashkenazi Haredi political party United Torah Judaism voted against the law on instructions from their spiritual leader Rabbi Yosef Shalom Eliashiv.
 Allowing the wives of Israel Defense Forces soldiers who have been missing in action for a long time to remarry, a verdict which is known as "the release of agunot" (התרת עגונות).
 That a woman should not wear a wig (sheitel) as a form of hair covering, but should wear headscarves (or snoods / hats / berets) instead. (According to Jewish Law, married women must cover their hair in public for reasons of modesty. Some Ashkenazi Haredi women have the practice of wearing sheitels for this purpose.)

Controversial statements 
Yosef made countless political remarks which aroused controversy. Statements deemed offensive relating to various groups and individuals were claimed by his supporters to have been taken out of context, although the American Jewish Committee and the Anti-Defamation League condemned what they termed his "hate speech". He claimed the Holocaust was God's retribution against the reincarnated souls of Jewish sinners. He also claimed that Israeli soldiers were killed in battle on account of their non-observance of Torah law. He was criticised for supporting the traditional role of women and minimising their capabilities. Following Hurricane Katrina in 2005, he blamed the tragedy on U.S. support for the Gaza disengagement, and on a general lack of Torah study in the area where the hurricane occurred. In 2009, he said about Yisrael Beitenu and its leader "whoever votes for Avigdor Lieberman gives strength to Satan".

Recommendations of the Plesner Committee 

In 2013, Yosef called for yeshiva students to emigrate from Israel rather than agree to serve in the army, stating:

In October 2013, immediately following Ovadia Yosef's death, his son, David Yosef stated to the Prime Minister that the drafting of Haredi students into the army had hurt him in his final months more than his physical illnesses.

Arabs and Palestinians 

In 2001, Yosef was quoted as saying of the Arabs:

Yosef later said that his sermon was misquoted, that he was referring to annihilation of Islamic terrorism, and not of all Arabs. He called for improving the living conditions of the Arab people in Israel, and said that he has deep respect for peace-seeking Arabs.

Israeli Justice Minister Meir Sheetrit condemned the sermon, saying: "A person of Rabbi Ovadia Yosef's stature must refrain from acrid remarks such as these... I suggest that we not learn from the ways of the Palestinians and speak in verbal blows like these."

Yosef drew criticism from the US State Department in August 2010 following a Saturday morning sermon in which he called for

Saeb Erekat, the chief Palestinian negotiator, said Yosef's statements were tantamount to a call for genocide against Palestinians, and demanded a firm response from the Israeli government. Israeli Prime Minister Benjamin Netanyahu distanced himself and his government from the sermon, stating that Yosef's words "do not reflect my approach, or the stand of the Israeli government".

The rabbi said he regretted his statements, and was said to have looked for a way of sending a conciliatory message to the Palestinians. Three weeks later, Yosef sent out a conciliatory message reiterating his old positions in support of the peace process. He wished the Palestinians and their leaders,

Remarks regarding gentiles 
In a sermon he delivered in October 2010, Yosef was strongly condemned (including, among others, by the Anti-Defamation League and the American Jewish Committee) after stating that "the sole purpose of non-Jews is to serve Jews". In his sermon, he said:
"Goyim were born only to serve us. Without that, they have no place in the world – only to serve the People of Israel. 

In Israel, death has no dominion over them... With gentiles, it will be like any person – they need to die, but [God] will give them longevity. Why? Imagine that one’s donkey would die, they'd lose their money.
This is his servant... That’s why he gets a long life, to work well for this Jew," Yosef said.

"Why are gentiles needed? They will work, they will plow, they will reap. We will sit like an effendi and eat. 

That is why gentiles were created"

Published works 
Among Yosef's earliest work was a detailed commentary on the Ben Ish Hai titled Halikhot Olam. He was asked to finish the commentary Kaf Ha'Chaim by Rabbi Yaakov Chaim Sofer after the author's death. Two sets of Yosef's responsa have been published, Yabia Omer and Yechaveh Da'at (both titles are references to Psalm 19). His responsa are noted for citing almost every source regarding a specific topic and are often referred to simply as indices of rulings. There is also another series of books under the title of Hazon Ovadia (not to be mistaken with the original books, which were responsa on Passover), which he has written concerning laws of Shabbat, holidays, and other topics.

Yosef printed a commentary on the Mishnah tractate Pirkei Avot ("Ethics of the Fathers") under the title Anaf Etz Avot, and Maor Israel, a commentary on various parts of the Talmud. His son, Rabbi Yitzhak Yosef, has published a widely read codification of Yosef's rulings entitled Yalkut Yosef. Another son, Rabbi David Yosef, has printed various siddurim and liturgy according to his father's rulings, and another halachic compendium entitled Halachah Berurah.

In 1970, Yosef was awarded the Israel Prize for Rabbinical literature.

See also 

 Moetzet Chachmei HaTorah, the Sephardic Haredim Council of wise Torah Sages 
 Avraham Yosef
 Yaakov Yosef
 Salah Hamouri

{{succession box|title=Sephardi Chief Rabbi of IsraelOvadia Yosef |before=Yitzhak Nissim||after=Mordechai Eliyahu'|years=1973–1983}}

 References 

 Further reading 
 Nitzan Chen and Anshel Pfeffer, Maran Ovadia Yosef: Habiografia (Rabbi Ovadia Yosef: The Biography): Jerusalem 2004
 R. Benny Lau, Mimaran ad Maran: Mishnato ha-Hilkhatit shel ha-Rav Ovadiah Yosef (From R. Yosef Karo to R. Ovadiah Yosef: The Halachic Teaching of Rabbi Ovadia Yosef): Tel Aviv 2005
 Zvi Aloush and Yossi Elituv, Hayyav, Mishnato u-Mahalkhav ha-Politiyim shel ha-Rav Ovadiah Yosef (The Life, Teaching and Political Activities of Rabbi Ovadia Yosef): Or Yehudah 2004
 Mi-Yosef ad Yosef Lo Kam ke-Yosef (From Yosef to Yosef arose none like Yosef): review of all three books by Marc B. Shapiro
 Review of the Chen and Pfeffer book by Rabbi Benjamin Lau (Friday, October 1, 2004 Ha'aretz) 
 Y. Choueka, Pirkei Hayim, a biography of Rabbi Aharon Choueka and his Yeshiva, Ahava VeAchva, in Minhat Aharon'', Y. Choueka and Haym Sabato (Eds.), Jerusalem, 1980, 15–32. (Hebrew)
 Zion Zohar, Oriental Jewry Confronts Modernity-The Case of Rabbi Ovadiah Yosef, Modern Judaism – Volume 24, Number 2, May 2004, pp. 120–149.
Marc Shapiro article

External links

Maran – a website containing videos of sermons given by Rabbi Ovadia Yosef
Halacha Yomit – a website containing daily Halacha given by Rabbi Ovadia Yosef
"Rabbi Ovadia Yosef - in His Own Words - An article by the Christian Science Monitor
Sephardic Pizmonim Project- Obadia Yosef Biography page with his personal pizmonim recordings
Article about Rabbi Yosef's method of psak (by Rabbi Yosef Gavriel Bechhofer) 

 
1920 births
2013 deaths
Shas politicians
20th-century Iraqi rabbis
Israeli Mizrahi Jews
Rishon LeZion (rabbi)
Iraqi emigrants to Mandatory Palestine
Leaders of political parties in Israel
Israel Prize in Rabbinical literature recipients
Israel Prize Rabbi recipients
Sephardic Haredi rabbis in Israel
20th-century rabbis in Jerusalem
21st-century rabbis in Jerusalem
Moetzet Chachmei HaTorah
Badatz Beit Yosef
Burials at Sanhedria Cemetery
Authors of books on Jewish law